Almașu is a commune located in Sălaj County, Transylvania, Romania. It is composed of nine villages: Almașu, Băbiu (Bábony), Cutiș (Kiskökényes), Jebucu (Zsobok), Mesteacănu (Almásnyíres), Petrinzel (Kispetri), Sfăraș (Farnas), Stana (Sztána) and Țăudu (Cold).

Sights 
 Reformed Church in Almașu (built in the 15th century), historic monument
 Reformed Church in Stana (built in the 17th century), historic monument
 Csáky Castle in Almașu (built in the 19th century), historic monument
 Almașu Citadel, medieval fortress built in the 13th century, historic monument

References

Communes in Sălaj County
Localities in Transylvania